The American Basketball League, often abbreviated to the ABL of 1996 was a professional women's basketball league in the United States. At the same time the ABL was being formed, the National Basketball Association (NBA) was creating the Women's National Basketball Association (WNBA). The ABL began league competition in the Fall of 1996, while the WNBA launched its first game in June 1997. Both organizations came into existence during a surge in popularity for women's basketball in the United States that followed the perfect 35–0 national championship season for the Connecticut Huskies in 1995 and the undefeated, gold medal-winning performance of the United States Women's basketball team at the 1996 Summer Olympics.

The ABL lasted two full seasons: 1996–97 and 1997–98. The Atlanta Glory and Long Beach Stingrays folded prior to the start of the 1998–99 season, and were replaced by two expansion teams, the Chicago Condors and Nashville Noise. On December 22, 1998, with almost no warning, the ABL declared Chapter 11 bankruptcy and suspended operations. Each team had played between 12 and 15 games of the 1998–99 season.

The ABL got off the ground before the WNBA, and at least early on its quality of play was higher than the rival league. This was partly due to the league's signing of a majority of players from the 1996 USA women's national team.  Although the WNBA was bankrolled by the NBA, the ABL offered higher salaries. The two leagues did not compete directly; the ABL played during the winter while the WNBA played during the summer. However, this arrangement put the ABL in competition with the established men's NBA for an audience. Ultimately, the ABL found the WNBA's stronger financial resources—augmented by the NBA's marketing machine—to be too much to overcome.

The league operated as a single-entity structure, which was intended to control costs until it found its feet.  However, it also meant that even the most basic decisions related to team operations had to go through the league office in Palo Alto, California. League officials were so fixated on national sponsorships that they hamstrung the teams' efforts to market themselves locally. The ABL was also underfinanced. Allison Hodges, general manager of the short-lived Condors, later told The New York Times that she was led to believe league officials rejected her marketing ideas because they clashed with its national focus, only to find out that the league did not have enough money to finance them. Hodges also believed the league had already planned to shut down before announcing the Chapter 11 filing.

Of all the ABL cities, Chicago, Seattle, and Atlanta now have WNBA teams.

1996–98 clubs

Seasons

1996–97

The 1996–97 ABL All-Star Game was played on December 15, 1996, at the Hartford Civic Center. The Western Conference defeated the Eastern Conference, 81–65, and the game's MVP was Tari Phillips.

1997–98

The 1997–98 ABL All-Star Game was played on January 18, 1998, at Disney's Wide World of Sports Complex in Lake Buena Vista, Florida. The Eastern Conference defeated the Western Conference, 102–73.

1998–99

The 1998–99 ABL All-Star Game was scheduled to be played on January 24, 1999, in San Jose, California, but was canceled when the league ceased operations in December 1998.

Notable players

Jennifer Azzi
Debbie Black
Cindy Brown
Edna Campbell
Sylvia Crawley
Teresa Edwards
Tonya Edwards, now head coach at Alcorn State University
Shalonda Enis
Jackie Joyner-Kersee, the Olympic-champion long jumper and heptathlete
Molly Goodenbour
Yolanda Griffith
Sonja Henning
Kedra Holland-Corn
Shannon Johnson
Carolyn Jones-Young
Venus Lacy
Andrea Lloyd-Curry
Stacey Lovelace
Michelle M. Marciniak
Nikki McCray
Carla McGhee
Chasity Melvin
Delisha Milton
Taj McWilliams-Franklin
Kate Paye, now an assistant coach at Stanford University
Tari Phillips
Elaine Powell
Katrina Price
Jennifer Rizzotti, now the President of the Connecticut Sun
Crystal Robinson
Saudia Roundtree
Sheri Sam
Katie Smith, now an assistant coach for the Minnesota Lynx
Charlotte Smith, now the head coach at Elon University
Dawn Staley, now the head coach at the University of South Carolina
Katy Steding
Kate Starbird
Sonja Tate
Val Whiting
Natalie Williams
Kara Wolters

See also
 National Women's Basketball League
 Women's American Basketball Association
 Women's National Basketball Association
 Women's Professional Basketball League
 American Basketball League (1996–1998) on television

References

External links
 John Sage's ABL webpage capture, containing old interviews, articles, and final statistics
 ABL on APBR.org website
 All-Star cards
 Professional basketball research

 
Defunct women's basketball leagues in the United States
Defunct professional sports leagues in the United States
Articles which contain graphical timelines
1996 establishments in the United States
1998 disestablishments in the United States
Sports leagues established in 1996
Sports leagues disestablished in 1998